Power of the Dragonflame is the fifth studio album released by Rhapsody. It was released on 23 April 2002 by Limb Music. It is the last chapter in the Emerald Sword Saga. In 2017, Loudwire ranked it as the 9th best power metal album of all time.

Track listing

Personnel

Rhapsody
Fabio Lione – vocals
Luca Turilli – lead and rhythm guitars
Alex Staropoli – keyboards, orchestral arrangements

Additional personnel
Herbie Langhans, Cinzia Rizzo, Robert Hunecke-Rizzo, Oliver Hartmann, Miro – choir
Miro – production
Bridget Fogle, Previn Moore – church choir
Bridget Fogle – female baroque voice
Manuel Staropoli – baroque recorders
Dana Lurie – lead violin
Jay Lansford – narration
Sascha Paeth – bass guitar, classical guitar (track 11), production
Johannes Monno – classical guitar (track 11)
Thunderforce – drums

Alex Holzwarth appears in the photoshoot but did not record on this album.

Charts

References

2002 albums
Rhapsody of Fire albums
Limb Music albums